The Iron Hills Conference was an athletic conference of twenty high schools located in Essex County, Morris County and Union County in New Jersey, United States. The Iron division was often regarded as one of the most competitive in the state.

The conference was split up at the end of the 2008-2009 sports season due to conference realignment changes made by the NJSIAA. The Essex County schools joined the Super Essex Conference, the Morris County schools joined the Northwest Jersey Athletic Conference, and the Union County schools joined the Union County Interscholastic Athletic Conference.

Member schools
There were 20 member schools in the Iron Hills Conference before the conference was split up.

Notes
East Orange Campus High School houses the upperclassmen; freshmen there are housed at East Orange Campus 9 High School.
Some of West Morris Central's teams go by Wolfpack as the team name. However, the Highlanders nickname is retained out of respect for the school's graduates.

External links
Iron Hills Conference website
New Jersey State Interscholastic Athletic Association

Essex County, New Jersey
Morris County, New Jersey
New Jersey high school athletic conferences
Union County, New Jersey